The Tony Ferrino Phenomenon is a British comedy written by and starring Steve Coogan and produced by Pozzitive Television. It centres around a concert given by the Portuguese popstar Tony Ferrino (played by Coogan), a music and dance spectacular which featured pop stars Mick Hucknall, Kim Wilde and Gary Wilmot in cameo roles.

The spoof choreography was led by a young Bruno Tonioli, and a recorded version of Steve Coogan as Tony Ferrino singing Tom Jones's "Help Yourself" was released by RCA Records at the same time as the TV show was released.

As part of the illusion that Tony Ferrino was a real character, the BBC also showed a fake documentary interview about Tony Ferrino's life - Introducing Tony Ferrino - Who? And Why? - A Quest. The interview as conducted by Peter Baynham, in character as Ross Woodward, a put-upon and nervous interview host.

Reception

The Tony Ferrino Phenomenon was very positively received, and Coogan revived the character in his 1998 national tour 'The Man Who Thinks He's It'. It won a Silver Rose at the Rose D'Or awards in Montreaux.

References

External links

BBC television comedy
1997 in British television
BBC Two